The 2016 KNSB Dutch Sprint Championships in speed skating were held in Heerenveen at the Thialf ice skating rink from 22 January to 23 January 2016. The tournament was part of the 2015–2016 speed skating season. Kai Verbij and Sanneke de Neeling won the sprint titles. The sprint championships were held at the same time as the 2016 KNSB Dutch Allround Championships.

Schedule

Medalist

Men's sprint

Women's sprint

Classification

Men's sprint

Women's sprint

Source:

References

KNSB Dutch Sprint Championships
KNSB Dutch Sprint Championships
2016 Sprint